"She Wants to Dance with Me" is a song written and recorded by Rick Astley in 1988. It is the lead single from his second studio album, Hold Me in Your Arms. The song was released in United Kingdom on September 20, 1988; it entered the chart at the number 16 and its highest chart position was number 6; it stayed 11 weeks in the UK Singles Chart. On the Billboard Hot 100, it also reached number 6. Astley kicked off Paula Abdul's "Straight Up", and stayed at number one for two weeks in Canada. It was an international success.

"She Wants to Dance with Me" was Astley's first self-composed single that he released. Astley performed the song at the 1989 Grammy Awards, and he changed the lyrics to:

In 2019, Astley recorded and released a 'Reimagined' version of the song for his album The Best of Me.

Composition
Astley was given the go-ahead to compose the first single from his second album, after rejecting producers Stock Aitken Waterman's intended lead track, "Nothing Can Divide Us" —  which was then given to Jason Donovan. The singer composed the track in the style of Whitney Houston's hit, "I Wanna Dance With Somebody (Who Loves Me)" in an effort to win the confidence of Pete Waterman, who was a huge fan of Houston's song.

The original recording of this song is performed in the key of F# major in a moderate tempo of 117 beats per minute. The song features simple synth riffs accompanied by a sparse drum machine pattern. The lyrics are about an unknown woman who is uninterested in “wild romance” and simply wants to dance with the narrator.

Music video
The video was shot at Rumours at 33 Wellington St, London, UK. As of June 2020, the location is a Byron Hamburgers restaurant.

Track listing
7" single
 "She Wants to Dance with Me" – 3:24
 "She Wants to Dance with Me" (Instrumental) – 4:03

7" (USA) and Mini CD single
 "She Wants to Dance with Me" (Watermix) – 3:14
 "She Wants to Dance with Me" (Instrumental) – 4:03
    
12" maxi, CD and maxi cassette single
 "She Wants to Dance with Me" (Extended Mix) – 7:14
 "It Would Take a Strong Strong Man" (Matt's Jazzy Guitar Mix) – 7:46
 "She Wants to Dance with Me" (Instrumental) – 4:03

12" single – Night & Day Remixes
 "She Wants to Dance with Me" (Bordering On A Collie Mix) – 6:04
 "She Wants to Dance with Me" (Remix) – 5:42

12" promo
 "She Wants to Dance with Me" (Bordering On A Collie Mix) – 6:05
 "She Wants to Dance with Me" (Album version) – 3:42

Personnel 
 Rick Astley – lead vocals 
 Ian Curnow – keyboards, Fairlight programming
 Robert Ahwai – guitars 
 Phil Todd – saxophone 
 Shirley Lewis – backing vocals 
 Mae McKenna – backing vocals 
 Leroy Osborne – backing vocals 
 Mike Stock – backing vocals

Chart performance

Year-end charts

References

1988 singles
Rick Astley songs
Dance-pop songs
RPM Top Singles number-one singles
Songs written by Rick Astley
Song recordings produced by Phil Harding (producer)
RCA Records singles
1988 songs
Songs about dancing